The São Pedro River is a river of Rio de Janeiro state in southeastern Brazil. It is a tributary of the Guandu River.

The  Jaceruba Environmental Protection Area in the municipality of Nova Iguaçu was created in 2002 with objectives that included protection and preservation of the forests, springs and headwaters of the São Pedro River basin.

See also
List of rivers of Rio de Janeiro

References

Brazilian Ministry of Transport

Rivers of Rio de Janeiro (state)